The 2019 Camping World 300 is a NASCAR Gander Outdoors Truck Series race held on June 28, 2019, at Chicagoland Speedway in Joliet, Illinois. Contested over 150 laps on the  intermediate speedway, it was the 12th race of the 2019 NASCAR Gander Outdoors Truck Series season.

Background

Track

Chicagoland Speedway is a  tri-oval speedway in Joliet, Illinois, southwest of Chicago. The speedway opened in 2001 and currently hosts NASCAR races. Until 2011, the speedway also hosted the IndyCar Series, recording numerous close finishes, including the closest finish in IndyCar history. The speedway is owned and operated by International Speedway Corporation and is located adjacent to Route 66 Raceway.

Entry list

Practice

First practice

Second practice

Final practice

Qualifying

Qualifying results

Race

Summary
Austin Hill started on pole. Grant Enfinger took the lead from him on lap 13, holding it for the majority of the stage. On the final lap of Stage 1, Brandon Jones inched past Enfinger and took the stage win.

Enfinger retook the lead afterwards, but managed to win Stage 2 himself after holding off a charging Jones. As the final stage began, Enfinger's run worsened as he got caught in a four-wide pack and fell to the back of the top 10. He was then pushed into the wall when Spencer Davis got loose underneath him, triggering a wreck that also collected Austin Wayne Self. Issues on pit road caused Enfinger to confront Hill after the race.

Brett Moffitt took the lead with 75 laps to go, and remained the fastest driver of the night. He briefly lost the lead during a series of green-flag pit stops. Moffitt's lead over runner-up Jones grew to around two seconds, with Moffitt eventually earning his second win of the season.

Stage Results

Stage One
Laps: 35

Stage Two
Laps: 35

Final Stage Results

Stage Three
Laps: 80

References

Camping World 225
NASCAR races at Chicagoland Speedway
Camping World 225